Eugene Puryear (born February 28, 1986, in Charlottesville, Virginia) is an American journalist, author, activist, politician, and host on Breakthrough News. In 2014, he was a candidate for the at-large seat in the DC Council with the D.C. Statehood Green Party. In the 2008 and 2016 United States presidential elections, Puryear was the vice presidential nominee of the Party for Socialism and Liberation (PSL).

Campaign for Council of the District of Columbia
In 2014, Puryear ran as a D.C. Statehood Green Party candidate for the At-Large City Council seat held at the time by Anita Bonds. His campaign put forward a 10-point program, which describes some of the policy positions taken by Puryear. On April 1, 2014, Puryear won the party's nomination, defeating G. Lee Aikin 67.3%–25.1%. On November 4, 2014, Puryear placed sixth out of 14 candidates in the general election.

Journalism 
Puryear wrote the book Shackled and Chained: Mass Incarceration in Capitalist America, which was published by PSL Publications. Among the book's innovative contributions is a critique of Michelle Alexander's "The New Jim Crow," because it doesn't attend to the historical transformations of white supremacy and capitalism. Mass incarceration "is a political and state response to the masses of Black people being thrown out of the productive process altogether," whereas "slavery and Jim Crow were designed around Black people actually laboring."

Puryear writes regularly for Liberation News, the newspaper of the Party for Socialism and Liberation. He has co-edited some of the PSL's books, such as Imperialism in the 21st Century: Updating Lenin's Theory a Century Later. He was the host of the daily political talk show By Any Means Necessary, on Radio Sputnik. He is currently the host of the shows The Freedom Side LIVE and the Punch Out on BreakThrough News. Additionally, he taught a 4-part digital course for Liberation School titled, "Black Struggle is Class Struggle," which analyzes Black Revolutionary History in the United States and its central role in the development of U.S. society.

Activism
Puryear studied at Howard University, where he became a lead organizer with the anti-war ANSWER coalition and has helped organize large protests against the Israeli blockade of Gaza. Puryear and the ANSWER coalition were involved in the campaign to free the Jena 6. As a freshman at Howard in 2005, Puryear was interviewed by The Washington Post as an "activist-in-training" and cited his engagement with activism against gentrification, racism, the US occupation of Iraq and other issues.

Puryear has been deeply involved in the Black Lives Matter movement.

Vice presidential campaigns
In 2008, Puryear ran on the Party for Socialism and Liberation's ticket alongside presidential nominee Gloria La Riva. The La Riva/Puryear slate was on the ballot in six states and received 6,818 total votes.

In July 2015, Puryear was announced as the running mate of Gloria La Riva, the Party for Socialism and Liberation's 2016 presidential nominee. However, he was not eligible to hold the office, as he would not have been at least 35 years old by Inauguration Day. He was critical of the Democratic presidential candidates Hillary Clinton and Bernie Sanders.

References

Further reading

External links 

 PSL 2016 campaign website
 D.C. City Council 2014 campaign website

1986 births
Living people
African-American candidates for Vice President of the United States
American anti–Iraq War activists
American communists
Black Lives Matter people
D.C. Statehood Green Party politicians
Howard University alumni
Party for Socialism and Liberation politicians
Writers from Charlottesville, Virginia
2008 United States vice-presidential candidates
21st-century American politicians
2016 United States vice-presidential candidates